God of This City may refer to:

 God of This City (Passion album), 2008 
 God of This City (Bluetree album), 2009